Tzachi Hanegbi (born 26 February 1957) is an Israeli politician and national security expert serving as Israel's National Security Advisor. A member of Likud, Hanegbi previously served as Minister of Agriculture and Rural Development, Minister of Regional Cooperation and Minister of Community Affairs.

He served as Minister of Justice, Minister of Internal Security, Minister of Intelligence and Nuclear Affairs, and Minister in the Prime Minister's office supervising Israel's intelligence agencies Mossad and Shin Bet. He was also responsible for overseeing Israel's Atomic Energy Agency, and served as the minister in charge of Israel's strategic relationship and security dialogue with the United States. He also served as Deputy Minister of Foreign Affairs and as the Chairman of the Knesset Foreign Affairs and Defense Committee and Majority Leader of the Knesset.

Hanegbi was appointed by Prime Minister Benjamin Netanyahu to serve as acting prime minister of Israel, from 10 to 17 September 2017, while the prime minister traveled abroad.

He lost his seat in the Knesset in the 2022 Israeli legislative election. In January of 2023, Hanegbi was appointed head of the National Security Council.

Biography
Hanegbi was born in Jerusalem, to a family of both Mizrahi Jewish (Yemeni-Jewish, Moroccan-Jewish, and Turkish-Jewish) and  Ashkenazi Jewish (Polish-Jewish) descent. His mother is Geula Cohen, a prominent member of the 1940s underground group Lehi and later MK for Likud and Tehiya. His father, Emmanuel Hanegbi, was the Operations Officer for the Lehi. After his military service in the paratroopers corps, Hanegbi studied international relations at the Hebrew University of Jerusalem. As president of the Hebrew University Student Union in 1980, he received a six-month suspended sentence for leading an attack on Arab students. Despite this incident, he became president of the National Union of Israeli Students later that year, holding that title until 1982. After his undergraduate studies, he went on to study law, obtaining an LL.B.

Hanegbi lives in Mevaseret Zion, a town on the outskirts of Jerusalem.

Political career
Hanegbi was first elected to the Knesset in the 1988 elections, and headed the Prime Minister's Bureau under Yitzhak Shamir. He retained his seat in the 1992 and 1996 elections, and was initially appointed Minister of Health in Binyamin Netanyahu's government, becoming Minister of Justice in September 1996 and dropping the health portfolio in November that year.

He lost his ministerial portfolio after Ehud Barak won the 1999 elections, but returned to government when Ariel Sharon won the special election for PM in 2001. Hanegbi was appointed Minister of the Environment in March 2001, adding the Transportation portfolio to his duties later in the year.

After Likud's convincing win in the 2003 elections, Hanegbi was appointed Minister of Internal Security. In September 2003 he was appointed by Prime Minister Ariel Sharon as minister in the Prime Minister's Office in charge of Israel's intelligence agencies – the Mossad and Shin Bet, and supervised Israel's Atomic Energy Agency.

When Sharon broke away to form Kadima in November 2005, Hanegbi was appointed interim chairman of Likud. On the following day, Hanegbi announced that he was also switching to Kadima, and resigned from the Knesset on 10 December. However, he reappeared in the Knesset in April 2006 after winning a seat in the 2006 elections. From May 2006 until December 2010 Hanegbi served as the Chairman of the Knesset's Security and Foreign Affairs Committee.

Placed fourth on the party's list, he retained his seat in the 2009 elections.

Trial 
In July 2010, after a four-year trial for election bribery, fraud and breach of trust, Hanegbi was cleared of all charges by a Jerusalem court. However, the three-judge panel found him guilty of perjury. The case stems from Hanegbi's denial that he was behind an ad boosting his appointments of Likud party's political activists to positions in the Ministry of the Environmental Protection. The judges verdict cleared Hanegbi of any criminal wrongdoing, accepting the defense's argument that such appointments were not illegal prior to 2004, and that this was the common practice among all cabinet members in all the previous governments since Israel's independence. The court ruled that selectively prosecuting Hanegbi for what was a widespread and common practice was wrong and unfair. Hanegbi was urged by his legal team to appeal the perjury conviction to Israel's High court of Justice. Following the verdict, several prominent leaders and officials publicly defended Hanegbi. Former Knesset Speaker Avraham Burg who opposes Hanegbi politically, has called for the firing of the prosecutor by the Attorney General.

On 9 November 2010, the Jerusalem court fined Hanegbi 10,000 NIS, and in a 2-to-1 decision imposed moral turpitude to the offense. Hanegbi therefore suspended himself from the Knesset and from his position as Chairman of the Foreign Affairs and Defence Committee, pending his legal appeal. His seat was taken by Nino Abesadze.

Return to Likud 

Hanegbi resigned from Kadima and returned to Likud when Kadima decided to leave the short-lived unity government in July 2012. Hanegbi explained that he believed Kadima's decision to quit the unity government was irresponsible, and motivated by short-term political goals. Following his decision, Hanegbi was re-elected on the Likud list in the January 2013 elections. In June 2014 he was appointed Deputy Minister of Foreign Affairs.

On 30 May 2016 Hanegbi was appointed Minister without portfolio in the Fourth Netanyahu Cabinet, dealing with issues concerning defense and foreign affairs.

On 2 June 2016 Hanegbi denied allegations that he intentionally wrote a report on Operation Protective Edge that cleared the Israeli government of all wrongdoing. He was appointed Acting Minister of Communications in February 2017, a post he held until being replaced by Ayoob Kara in May.

See also
List of Israeli public officials convicted of crimes or misdemeanors

References

External links
 Tzachi Hanegbi's official website

1957 births
Living people
Deputy ministers of Israel
Hebrew University of Jerusalem Faculty of Social Sciences alumni
Israeli Ashkenazi Jews
Israeli people of Moroccan-Jewish descent
Israeli people of Polish-Jewish descent
Israeli people of Turkish-Jewish descent
Israeli people of Yemeni-Jewish descent
Israeli politicians convicted of crimes
Israeli Sephardi Jews
Jewish Israeli politicians
Kadima politicians
Likud politicians
Members of the 12th Knesset (1988–1992)
Members of the 13th Knesset (1992–1996)
Members of the 14th Knesset (1996–1999)
Members of the 15th Knesset (1999–2003)
Members of the 16th Knesset (2003–2006)
Members of the 17th Knesset (2006–2009)
Members of the 18th Knesset (2009–2013)
Members of the 19th Knesset (2013–2015)
Members of the 20th Knesset (2015–2019)
Members of the 21st Knesset (2019)
Members of the 22nd Knesset (2019–2020)
Members of the 23rd Knesset (2020–2021)
Members of the 24th Knesset (2021–2022)
Ministers of Communications of Israel
Ministers of Environment of Israel
Ministers of Health of Israel
Ministers of Justice of Israel
Ministers of Public Security of Israel
Ministers of Transport of Israel
Israeli Mizrahi Jews
People from Jerusalem
Perjurers
Tel Aviv University alumni